Stathmopoda auriferella is a species of moth in the Stathmopodidae family. It is found in the Oriental and Afrotropical regions. In the Palearctic it is only found in subtropical areas such as the Middle East and the Russian Far East.

The wingspan is 9–13 mm. Adults are on wing from June to December. There are probably two to three generations per year.

The larvae live in silk spinnings (a shelter like the web of a spider) on a wide range of rotting plants, although they are also found on living wounded plant tissue. It is considered a minor pest on some species, such as Actinidia sinensis, Mangifera and Sorghum.

References

External links
 www.jpmoths.org

Stathmopodidae
Moths of Africa
Moths of Japan
Fauna of the Gambia
Moths of Seychelles
Moths described in 1864